Santa Maria della Versa is a comune (municipality) in the Province of Pavia in the Italian region Lombardy, located about 50 km south of Milan and about 25 km southeast of Pavia.

Santa Maria della Versa borders the following municipalities: Alta Val Tidone, Castana, Golferenzo, Lirio, Montecalvo Versiggia, Montù Beccaria, Pietra de' Giorgi, Rovescala, Ziano Piacentino.

References

External links
 Official website

Cities and towns in Lombardy